The 2010 MNL Grand Royal is the Myanmar National League's first full regular season. The MNL was founded in 2009, and two separate cup competitions were held. Mandalay-based Yadanabon FC won both competitions.

League table
The season opener was between the champion Yadanarbon F.C. and Zeya Shwe Myay on 13 March 2010. The title deciding match was also between the champion Yadanabon and Zeya Shwe Myay on 9 November 2010 and Yadanabon won the match 2–1. The last match of the 2010 season was played on 10 November 2010 between Yangon United F.C. and Okkthar United ending in a 3–3 draw. Below is the league table for 2010 season.

Top scorers

References

External links
Season on soccerway.com

Myanmar National League seasons
1
Myanmar
Myanmar